Jawahar Navodaya Vidyalaya, Golaghat is a CBSE affiliated school in Golaghat district of Assam under the Shillong region of Navodaya Vidyalaya Samiti (NVS). One of 557 JNVs known for its academics, spread all over India by the Government of India. It is located 13 km from Golaghat town. This school is a residence school and all facilities to the students is free of cost. The entrance test for admission into 6th and 9th class of Jawahar Navodaya Vidyalaya, Golaghat is being conducted by the Navodaya Vidyalaya Samiti. The school is affiliated to CBSE. There are classes being conducted from 6th standard to 12th standard.  Currently, the Principal is Mrs Arati Pattanayak.

References

External links
JNV Golaghat Official website
Facebook Page

Jawahar Navodaya Vidyalayas in Assam
Schools in Assam
Schools in Golaghat
Golaghat district
1995 establishments in Assam
Educational institutions established in 1995